Roberto V. Pesqueira Morales (1882 – 1966) was a Mexican politician who was elected twice to the Chamber of Deputies and was commissioned by President Venustiano Carranza to work as a confidential agent in the United States and secure diplomatic recognition to his regime.

Pesqueira was born in Arizpe, Sonora. His older brother, Ignacio, went on to serve as Governor of Sonora. Roberto joined Francisco I. Madero's Anti-Reelectionist Party in 1910 and was elected federal deputy representing the first district of Sonora in 1913, but refused to serve in the Chamber of Deputies after the consummation of Victoriano Huerta's  on 20 February 1913, and decided to join the revolutionary forces instead.

He was elected federal deputy once again in 1917 and acquired oil fields some years later. In February 1923 he wrote a letter to President Álvaro Obregón, alerting him of some irregularities detected in his foreign competitors; in particular, the Huasteca Oil Company.

See also
 Constitutionalists in the Mexican Revolution
 United States–Mexico relations

References

External links
Pesqueira's secret telegram to President Venustiano Carranza (Soumaya Museum, in Spanish).

Members of the Chamber of Deputies (Mexico)
Mexican diplomats
People of the Mexican Revolution
People from Sonora
1882 births
1966 deaths